The 1897 Virginia Orange and Blue football team represented the University of Virginia as an independent the 1897 college football season. Led by second-year coach Martin Bergen, the team went 6–2–1 and claims a Southern co-championship.  The Cavaliers tied Vanderbilt in the southern championship game. The Georgia game saw the death of Richard Von Albade Gammon. The team's captain was James Morrison.

Schedule

References

Virginia
Virginia Cavaliers football seasons
Virginia Orange and Blue football